Jayron Kearse (born February 11, 1994) is an American football safety for the Dallas Cowboys of the National Football League (NFL). He played college football at Clemson and was drafted by the Minnesota Vikings in the seventh round of the 2016 NFL Draft.

Early years
A native of Fort Myers, Florida, he attended Cypress Lake High School. As a freshman, he initially measured 5-foot-8 and played safety on defense, before experiencing a growth spurt. As a sophomore, he was named the starting quarterback on a team that ran a Wing T offense, posting 1,049 rushing yards, 13 rushing touchdowns and 5 passing touchdowns. As a junior running quarterback, he rushed for 1,600 yards and 17 touchdowns.

As a senior in 2012, he transferred to South Fort Myers High School. He played as a safety, running back and wide receiver, helping lead his team to an 11–2 record, after rushing for 528 yards (12.3 yards per carry) and five touchdowns, to go along with five more receiving scores while averaging 18.9 yards per reception; as a safety on defense, he tallied 87 tackles, three sacks and one interception. Following his senior season, he was invited to play in the Offense-Defense All-American Bowl in Houston, Texas. Kearse also participated in track & field for the Wolfpack.

Frequently listed as an "athlete" by most recruiting services, Kearse was rated as a four-star recruit by Rivals.com, as well as the No. 16 athlete in the nation according to both Rivals and 247Sports.com. He was viewed as the seventh best outside linebacker in the class of 2012 by Scout.com, while MaxPreps listed him as the fifteenth best athlete in the nation and considered him a four-star recruit.

Kearse originally committed to play college football at Auburn University in August 2011, but in January 2012, he verbally committed to the University of Miami after the Tigers lost coach Gus Malzahn to Arkansas State. He posted a picture of himself on his Twitter feed holding a Miami helmet and wearing a Hurricanes sweatshirt standing next to Hurricanes coach Al Golden. However, after attending camp at Clemson in June, he de-committed from the Hurricanes and ended up committing to Clemson University on August 2, 2012. Kearse stated: "I chose Clemson because the coaches are genuine people that care about their athletes, and is just a great place to be with a group of guys who all want the best for you."

College career
Kearse accepted a football scholarship from Clemson University, where he focused on playing strong safety under head coach Dabo Swinney from 2013 to 2015. He amassed 164 total tackles (11.5 tackles for loss), seven interceptions, 11 pass breakups, two forced fumbles and two recovered fumbles in 1,998 snaps over 40 games with 29 starts in his career.

Freshman season

Two weeks before his freshman season began, Kearse was a candidate to play nickel back in Clemson's five-DB formations, but a shoulder injury caused him to miss the end of fall camp and the opener against the University of Georgia, so fellow freshman strong safety Korrin Wiggins moved to nickel and Kearse settled in as Travis Blanks’ backup. In the following three games of the season, Kearse logged some spare playing time in home blowouts over South Carolina State in week 2 and Wake Forest in week 4 until he was thrust into 75 snaps during Clemson's 49–14 win over the Syracuse Orange in week 5, recording eight tackles and his first career interception.

The following week, he started against Boston College and contributed with 4 tackles. However, in week 7, Kearse played just three snaps against Florida State. In the next two weeks, at Maryland and Virginia, a knee injury to Travis Blanks gave Kearse more playing time and he recorded 2 interceptions.

In the season finale against South Carolina, he played all 81 snaps and had 10 tackles. In the 2014 Orange Bowl 40-35 win against Ohio State, he had 9 tackles and one key interception.

As a true freshman, he played in 12 games with three starts, compiling 55 tackles (0.5 for loss), a career-high four interceptions (led the team) and one forced fumble.

Sophomore season

As a sophomore in 2014, he became a full time starter at strong safety (12 out of 13 starts). He recorded 67 tackles (5 for loss), two interceptions, 7 pass breakups, three sacks and one fumble recovery.

Against the #1 ranked Florida State University, he had 4 tackles and one interception. He had 4 tackles and one fumble recovery in the 2014 Russell Athletic Bowl against Oklahoma University.

Junior season

As a junior in 2015, he used his uncommon size for a safety, to provide a physical presence in the Clemson secondary. He registered 87 tackles (6.5 for loss), one interception, 8 passes defensed, one forced fumble and one fumble recovery. He received second-team All-American honors from the Associated Press.

Against Georgia Tech, he shared player of the game honors after setting a career-high 3 tackles for loss. He made 10 tackles in the 2015 Orange Bowl against Oklahoma University. He tallied 3 tackles in the National Championship Game loss against the University of Alabama

After the 2016 national championship game, Kearse announced that he would forgo his senior season and enter the NFL draft, with many mock drafts projecting him as a late 1st round selection.

Statistics

Professional career

Minnesota Vikings

2016 season
Kearse was selected by the Minnesota Vikings in the seventh round (244th overall) of the 2016 NFL Draft, dropping after posting a 4.62 time in the 40-yard dash and being criticized for taking bad tackling angles. He mentioned in the media that he watched hopelessly as he was passed on by NFL teams round after round. "I threw the caps on the ground after I was drafted." Kearse said. "The Vikings gave me a shot. 31 passed on me, so 31 got thrown on the ground. The Vikings are the lucky ones. I'm definitely going to make the other 31 pay.”

As a rookie, he was one of the three tallest safeties in the league at 6-foot-4 and joined his former college teammate, cornerback Mackensie Alexander, who was taken by the Vikings in the second round.

Kearse saw his first significant action of the 2016 season in Week 7 against the Philadelphia Eagles, playing 52-of-58 snaps and recording two tackles after starter Andrew Sendejo went down with an ankle injury after intercepting a pass. He appeared in 16 games with one start, collecting 7 defensive tackles and 6 special teams tackles (tied for sixth on the team). He made his first career start in the seventh game against the Chicago Bears. He had 6 tackles against the Philadelphia Eagles.

2017 season
In 2017, he played mostly on special teams. He appeared in 15 regular season games and 2 playoff contests. He tallied 3 defensive tackles (one for loss) and 14 special teams tackles (fourth on the team). His first career tackles for loss came in the fourteenth game against the Cincinnati Bengals.

2018 season
In 2018, he appeared in 16 games with one start. He played mostly as a slot cornerback in the team's "big nickel" package. He posted 20 tackles (3 for loss), half
sack, 2 quarterback hurries, 2 pass breakups and 18 special teams tackles (led the team).

He made his first career pass breakup against the Los Angeles Rams. He had 4 tackles (2 for loss), a half sack, one quarterback hurry and one special teams tackle against the New York Jets and New Orleans Saints.

2019 season
In 2019, he appeared in 15 games with 3 starts at free safety. He also played in one playoff contest. He registered during the season 27 tackles, one quarterback hurry, 6 pass breakups and one special teams tackle. He had a career-high 8 tackles and one pass breakup against the Atlanta Falcons. He made his first career interception against the Dallas Cowboys, when he caught a last second Hail Mary pass attempt to close a 28-24 win. He defended a potential game-winning touchdown, by covering rookie tight end Noah Fant on two consecutive pass attempts in the end zone, helping to seal a 27–23 comeback victory against the Denver Broncos.

Kearse finished his career with the Vikings after appearing in 62 games with five starts (only missed two games), while making 79 tackles, one interception, 8 passes defensed and 39 special teams tackles.

Detroit Lions
On March 27, 2020, Kearse signed a one-year, $2.75 million contract with the Detroit Lions. On July 31, 2020, he was suspended the first three games of 2020 for violating the NFL substance-abuse policy. He was reinstated from suspension and activated on October 1, 2020.

Kearse appeared in 11 games with 7 starts, posting 56 tackles, one quarterback pressure, 2 pass breakups, one forced fumble and 3 special teams tackles. He was named the full-time starter at strong safety in the eighth game against his former team the Minnesota Vikings. He tied a career-high 8 tackles against the Minnesota Vikings, Washington Football Team and Chicago Bears.

He didn't play in Week 16 against the Tampa Bay Buccaneers, after reportedly leaving the hotel room without permission and being late to a bed check on a road trip, which violated the team rules. On December 28, 2020, Kearse was waived by the Lions before the season finale.

Baltimore Ravens
On December 31, 2020, Kearse was signed to the Baltimore Ravens' practice squad. His practice squad contract with the team expired after the season on January 25, 2021.

Dallas Cowboys
Kearse signed as a free agent with the Dallas Cowboys on March 30, 2021. He was named the Cowboys starting strong safety in 2021, starting 15 games recording a career-high 101 tackles, one sack, 10 passes defensed, and two interceptions.

On March 21, 2022, Kearse signed a two-year, $10 million contract extension with the Cowboys.

Statistics

Personal life
Kearse has family ties to the NFL, as Jevon Kearse, former Florida Gators All-American and longtime Tennessee Titans defensive end is his uncle, and his cousin, Phillip Buchanon, played college football at Miami and was taken in the first round of the 2002 NFL Draft by the Oakland Raiders. At the age of 14, Kearse was out of football and in the summer of 2008 got arrested on a felony charge of robbery with another minor in Fort Myers, Florida, according to WBBH-TV. Kearse called that a “turning point” in his life.

On October 27, 2019, Kearse was stopped by a Minnesota State Patrol Trooper for driving around a construction barricade onto the closed portion of U.S. Interstate 94 at Cedar Avenue in Minneapolis, Minnesota. He was placed under arrest on suspicion of driving while intoxicated (DWI) and had a blood alcohol content of .10. During a search of Kearse's vehicle, the trooper found a loaded firearm for which Kearse did not have a permit. He was arrested on fourth-degree DWI and possession of a firearm without a permit. He pleaded guilty on February 27, 2020, to the charges and was sentenced to probation and community service.

References

External links
Dallas Cowboys bio

1994 births
Living people
Sportspeople from Fort Myers, Florida
Players of American football from Florida
American football safeties
Clemson Tigers football players
Minnesota Vikings players
Detroit Lions players
Baltimore Ravens players
African-American players of American football
Dallas Cowboys players
21st-century African-American sportspeople